Liberty High School (LHS) is a four-year  high school located in  Liberty, Missouri.  Its 2019–2020 enrollment is over 1,800, having rapidly increased with the addition of the freshman class for the first time during the 20132014 school year. LHS is one of two high schools in the Liberty Public School District, alongside Liberty North High School (Liberty, Missouri) which opened in 2010. Liberty High School has two feeder middle schools, Liberty Middle School and Discovery Middle School (formerly South Valley Junior High).

History

Liberty High School was first established in 1890 as Clay County, Missouri's first four-year high school.  Its original campus, located at the corner of Mill and Gallatin is now the site of Franklin Elementary.  In 1923, the school, overcrowded in its first facility with 300 students, relocated to the former site of the Liberty Ladies College, at Kansas and Fairview streets.  As Liberty grew into a major suburb of the Kansas City Metropolitan Area, the district built a new facility near Interstate 35, about one mile (1.6 km) west of the downtown area, and converted the previous facility to Liberty Junior High.

In 2010, Liberty Public Schools founded its second high school, Liberty North High School separating the graduating classes of 2012 and 2013 to travel across town to 104th Street, along A Highway, a few miles north of LHS. Although a major change for the district, it was a necessary one for overcrowding and class size issues.

During the 20132014 school year, LHS and LNHS began incorporating freshmen classes to the high school buildings to relieve overcrowding issues at the district's middle level buildings.

Athletics/Activities

The Liberty High School mascot is the Bluejay. School colors are royal blue, gray, and white.

Several programs at Liberty have received state and national accolades. Its broadcasting program operates cable channel 18 on Time Warner Cable under the non-assigned call letters KLPS. As of August 2017, Liberty High School was ranked 1st in the nation in debate and forensics according to the National Speech and Debate Association, starting the 2017–18 school year with over 600 speech and forensics degrees on the team. As of 2018, Liberty High School has established a competitive marching band knows as the blue and white Vanguard. Liberty's baseball team won the state championship at the highest class level in 2002 and 2021.

Notable alumni
David Allen, American football player
Scott Carroll, baseball player
James Dewees, musician with Reggie and the Full Effect, The Get Up Kids and My Chemical Romance. 
Shea Groom, soccer player
Marcus Lucas, American football player
Alex Saxon, Actor
Eric Staves, Actor
Deron Winn, UFC fighter

References

External links
Liberty District Website
Liberty High School Website

Educational institutions established in 1890
High schools in Clay County, Missouri
Public high schools in Missouri
1890 establishments in Missouri